Coenagrion ponticum is a species of damselfly in the family Coenagrionidae. It is found in Azerbaijan, Georgia, and Turkey. Its natural habitats are rivers, freshwater lakes, and freshwater marshes. It is threatened by habitat loss.

References

Coenagrionidae
Insects described in 1929
Taxonomy articles created by Polbot